Linden Grove was once a nationally designated historic place located at 1100 Grove Road in Castle Shannon, Pennsylvania, but the original building (circa 1872) was torn down and it was delisted on January 20, 2000.  The current building there is a more recent construction called The Linden Grove Nightclub.  The original "Linden Grove was built as an attraction to German picnickers, as were several other groves patronized by various ethnic groups. Wagons with benches met picnickers at the train station and took them to whichever grove catered to their nationality."

References

Houses in Allegheny County, Pennsylvania
Demolished buildings and structures in Pennsylvania
Former houses in the United States
Former National Register of Historic Places in Pennsylvania
Houses completed in 1872
1872 establishments in Pennsylvania